The Seaward 26RK is an American trailerable sailboat that was designed by Nick Hake as a cruiser and first built in 2005.

The boat is also sometimes referred to as the Hake 26RK.

Production
The design was built by Hake Yachts in the United States, starting in 2005, but it is now out of production. The boat was actually built by Island Packet Yachts, owned by Hake Marine.

Design
The Seaward 26RK is a recreational keelboat, built predominantly of fiberglass, with wood trim. The deck is cored with Divinycell foam. It has a fractional sloop rig; a nearly plumb stem; an open, walk-through transom; a vertically retractable, transom-hung rudder controlled by a tiller or optional wheel and a retractable, lead-cored, lifting keel. It displaces  and carries  of lead ballast.

The boat is normally fitted with a small outboard motor for docking and maneuvering, but a Yanmar inboard diesel engine was a factory option.

The design has sleeping accommodation for four people, with a bow cabin "V"-berth and two main cabin settee berths, around a flip-up table. The galley is located on the port side just forward of the companionway ladder. The galley is equipped with a single-burner stove, icebox and a sink. The head is portable type, with an enclosing door optional.

Operational history
In a 2005 review in Practical Sailor, Darrell Nicholson wrote, "this boat reflects a thoughtful approach to design that increases user comfort, though its sail plan may disappoint more performance-minded sailors. The additional space in the cockpit and waterline length are a plus, especially since they add only 200 lbs. to the displacement. And we think owners of the 26RK will be pleased at the boat’s ability to gunkhole in bodies of water where deeper draft vessels would be restricted."

See also
List of sailing boat types

References

External links
 Official website archives on archive.org

Keelboats
2000s sailboat type designs
Sailing yachts 
Trailer sailers
Sailboat type designs by Nick Hake
Sailboat types built by Hake Yachts